Ranikuthi is an urban area in South Kolkata, India. It is a part of Tollygunge area.

References

Neighbourhoods in Kolkata